Viljo Lietola (9 October 1888 – 29 October 1955) was a Finnish footballer. He competed in the men's tournament at the 1912 Summer Olympics.

References

1888 births
1955 deaths
Finnish footballers
Finland international footballers
Olympic footballers of Finland
Footballers at the 1912 Summer Olympics
Sportspeople from Vyborg
Association football midfielders